Hayden may refer to:

Places

Inhabited places in the United States
Hayden, Alabama
Hayden, Arizona
Hayden's Ferry, former name of Tempe, Arizona
Hayden, California, former name of Hayden Hill, California
Hayden, Colorado
Hayden, Idaho
Hayden Lake, Idaho
Hayden, Indiana
Hayden Island, Portland, Oregon, an island and neighborhood

Geographic features in the United States
Hayden Butte or Tempe Butte, an andesite butte of volcanic origin in Tempe, Arizona
Hayden Creek (disambiguation)
Hayden Mountain (disambiguation)
Hayden Peak (Utah), a mountain in Utah
Hayden Valley, a large sub-alpine valley in Yellowstone National Park

Other places
Hayden, Gloucestershire, a village in the UK

People
Hayden (given name)
Hayden (surname)
Hayden (musician) (born 1971), a Canadian folk musician

Other uses
Hayden (electronics company), a British guitar amplification manufacturer
Hayden Geological Survey of 1871, in northwestern Wyoming
Hayden mango or Haden, a mango cultivar
Hayden Planetarium, New York City, New York, United States

See also
Haden (disambiguation)
Haydn (disambiguation)
Haydon (disambiguation)
Heyden (disambiguation)
Heydon (disambiguation)
Ayden, North Carolina